Acacia lazaridis is a shrub belonging to the genus Acacia and the subgenus Juliflorae that is native to north eastern Australia.

Description
It has flattened to angular branchlets that are a maroon-brown colour but become grey as they age with prominent ribbing and often with a powdery white coating. Like most species of Acacia it has phyllodes rather than true leaves. It blooms between February and November producing golden flowers.

Distribution
It is endemic to western parts of the Kennedy and Cook Districts of Queensland usually along the lower slopes of the Great Dividing Range where it is usually situated on ridges, slopes or hill tops growing in gravelly red soils or shallow sandy soils over sandstone or granite bedrocks as a part of Eucalyptus forest or woodland communities or in scrubland along with other species of Acacia and species of Triodia.

See also
List of Acacia species

References

lazaridis
Flora of Queensland
Taxa named by Leslie Pedley
Plants described in 1981